Danilo Kocevski (23 April 1947 – 13 September 2020) was a Macedonian literary critic, novelist, playwright and poet, as well as a noted chronicler of the history of Skopje.
He appeared in the 2001 TV Show Dossier Skopje dressed as Superman.

Books published

Essays and Criticism
 Yes and No (1981)
 For New Trends (1984)
 Still Moves (1985)
 Criticism as a Delusion (1988)
 The Poetics of Postmodernism (1989)
 Antichomes of criticism (1989)
 Modern and postmodern (1993)
 Postmodern Currents (1996)
 New Essays (2001)
 The Revolt of the Intellectuals (2007)
 The paths of literary criticism (2010)
 For Literature till the last breath (2016)

Novels
 Odyssey (1991)
 Will we go to Joe (1992)
 Justiniana, the city that does not exist (1999)
 Novel for Noah (2003)
 Picolomini at the gates of Skopje (2005)

Prose
 Travel to Arcachon (1989)
 The Magic of Skopje (1997)

Poetry
 Where the song is born (1992)
 Poet's Death (1995)

See also
 List of people from Kumanovo

References

People from Kumanovo
1947 births
2020 deaths
Macedonian writers